Lucy Gordon may refer to:

 Lucy Gordon (actress) (1980–2009), English actress and model
 Lucy Gordon (tennis), American tennis player
 Lucy Gordon (writer), English novelist